Royal Air Force Wellingore or more simply RAF Wellingore is a former Royal Air Force fighter relief landing ground located  south of Navenby, Lincolnshire and  south of Lincoln, Lincolnshire, England.

History
The airfield was originally opened in 1917 as a Royal Naval Air Service station called Wellingore Heath. The airfield reopened in 1935. By the winter of 1939/40, the airfield was fully operational and consisted of two grass runways, a concrete perimeter track and several hangars. It initially operated as a Relief Landing Ground (RLG) for RAF Cranwell before later operating as a RLG for RAF Digby. Various squadrons equipped with Spitfires, Hurricanes, Blenheims and Beaufighters flew from the station.

The airfield was closed in 1947.

Squadrons

 No. 29 Squadron RAF (Blenheim then Beaufighter night fighters) - July 1940 to April 1941
 No. 402 Squadron RCAF (RCAF Spitfires) - May 1941 to June 1941 & January 1944 to April 1944
 No. 412 Squadron RCAF (RCAF Spitfires) - October 1941 to May 1942
 No. 54 Squadron RAF - June 1942 to June 1942
 No. 81 Squadron RAF (Spitfires) - September 1942 to October 1942
 No. 154 Squadron RAF (Spitfires) - September 1942 to November 1942
 No. 288 Squadron RAF - December 1942 to January 1943
 No. 309 Polish Fighter-Reconnaissance Squadron
 No. 349 (Belgian) Squadron RAF (Spitfires) May 1943
 No. 416 Squadron RCAF (Hurricanes) - May 1943 to June 1943 & September 1943 to October 1943
 No. 439 Squadron RCAF (Hurricanes) - August 1943
 No. 613 Squadron RAF (Mustangs) - April 1943 to May 1943
 No. 17 Service Flying Training School RAF  (Harvards and Oxfords)- 1944-45
Units
 No. 3 (Coastal) Operational Training Unit RAF
 No. 11 Service Flying Training School RAF
 No. 17 Service Flying Training School RAF
 No. 19 Flying Training School RAF
 No. 56 OTU
 No. 2953 Squadron RAF Regiment

John Gillespie Magee Jr
In December 1941, John Gillespie Magee, Jr., author of the famous aviation poem "High Flight", took off from Wellingore on his final flight, in which he was killed.

Guy Gibson
In November 1940, Guy Gibson, who later led Operation Chastise (better known as the Dambusters Raid), was stationed at Wellingore.  Later in November 1940, he flew from here to Cardiff for his wedding. He had his first victories as a nightfighter pilot operating from here. In April 1942, a German intruder aircraft attacked Gibson's aircraft while landing at Wellingore, injuring his navigator.

Post-war use
The station was used as a prisoner of war camp before being handed back to the local land owner. Many of the original buildings, including the control have been demolished. A number of airfield defence concrete bunkers remain dotted around the airfield which has been returned to agricultural use.

See also
 List of former Royal Air Force stations

References

Citations

Bibliography

Royal Air Force stations in Lincolnshire
1917 establishments in England
Royal Air Force stations of World War II in the United Kingdom